Knives to the Future marks the ninth album from Project 86. Team Black Recordings released the project on November 11, 2014. Project 86 worked with Matt McClellan and Andrew Schwab on the production of this album.

Reception

Signaling in a four and a half star review by HM Magazine, Sean Huncherick replies, "Knives to the Future not only carries the hype, but vaults it over." Michael Weaver, indicating in a four and a half star review from Jesus Freak Hideout, recognizes, "Project's latest is musically hard-hitting and lyrically challenging and on point." Shaving a half star off her review is New Release Tuesday's Mary Nikkel, responding, "This is a project likely to further solidify the loyalty of their dedicated following." Specifying in a five star review by Indie Vision Music, Lee Brown reports, "Knives to the Future is poetry that is formatted for the pleasure of your auditory canals." Andrew Funderburk, awarding the album four stars at Christian Music Review, writes, "Although Knives to the Future is lyrically sound and has stand-out tracks, like any album should, the overall general feel does lack somewhat in the energy that rock usually gives." Rating the album an eight star release for Jesus Wired, Topher P. says, "Although there are, like practically any other release, a few low points on the record, that tally stays at only a few." Jacob Neff, awarding the album an eight and a half out of ten at Christ Core, writes, "Project 86 has created a beautiful, powerful, and complex album that has further stretched the band’s creative muscles."

Track listing

Personnel
Adapted from AllMusic.

Project 86
Andrew Schwab – vocals
 Darren King – guitar, keyboards
 Cody Driggers – bass, backing vocals
 Ryan Wood – drums

Addition musicians
 Joshua Clifton (Ravenhill) – gang vocals
 Jeff Gingrich – cello, violin
 Allison Schwab – piano

Production
 Alan Douches – mastering
 Steve Evetts – mixing
 Matt McClellan – engineer, keyboards, producer
 Dan Mumford – packaging

Charts

References

2014 albums
Project 86 albums